Beat Shazam is an American television musical game show which premiered on Fox on May 25, 2017. The show is hosted by Jamie Foxx, who is also an executive producer on the show along with Jeff Apploff (who created the show with Wes Kauble). On July 12, 2017, Fox renewed the series for a second season, which premiered on May 29, 2018. On August 21, 2018, Fox renewed the series for a third season that premiered on May 20, 2019. On January 31, 2020, the series was renewed for a fourth season, which was originally going to premiere later that year, but due to the COVID-19 pandemic, it instead premiered on June 3, 2021. On April 5, 2022, the series was renewed for a fifth season, which premiered on May 23.

Gameplay
Three teams of two players each compete through four rounds (five in season 1) to identify a series of songs, banking money for each correct answer. After the fourth round (fifth in season 1), the highest-scoring team plays head-to-head against the Shazam app, attempting to increase their winnings by naming up to six songs before it can identify them. Any team that beats Shazam on all six songs wins the grand prize of $1,000,000.

Beat Shazam uses the Billboard Hot 100 music chart as its only source for song titles.

Main game

Season 1
In season 1, the main game consists of five rounds. In each round, a category is given and several songs (usually five, but occasionally four) are played, one at a time and with four choices displayed for each title. Teams separately and secretly lock in their guesses at the title, and the team that chooses correctly in the fastest time wins money. If two or more teams lock in the correct answer and have the same fastest time, they each score for that song. There is no penalty for incorrect answers.

The final song of each round is designated as the "Fast Track" and is played at double value. During the season finale, this song is played as a "Fast Track Challenge," in which the teams must respond within the time needed for Shazam to identify it. No multiple-choice answers are offered, and only the first team to buzz in is given a chance to name the song and win the money for it.

Season 2
From season 2 onwards, the main game consists of four rounds. The first round is the "Shazam Shuffle", where each song is from a different category. The first six songs are worth $2,000 each, and the Fast Track is worth $4,000. In the second round, each team picks from two categories, with the category chosen by majority rule, (at least two teams), being played. The first four songs are worth $3,000 each and the Fast Track is worth $6,000, (however, in some episodes of the show, four songs are played in the round instead of five). In the third round, one member of each team plays, the first four songs are worth $5,000 each and the Fast Track is worth $10,000. The fourth round is a standard round played similar to the main game from season 1, where the first four songs are worth $10,000 each and the Fast Track is worth $20,000.

Season 3
In season 3, the first two rounds are played the same way as in season 2, with two newly revised rounds. The first round is the "Shazam Shuffle", where only the number of songs is reduced from 7 to 5. The first four songs are worth $2,000 each and the Fast Track is worth $4,000. In the second round, now titled "That's My Jam!", each team picks from two categories, and whichever category chosen by at least two teams gets played. The first three songs are worth $3,000 each and the Fast Track is worth $6,000. In the third round, "Corinne's Choice", the category is chosen by the DJ. The first three songs are worth $5,000 each and the Fast Track is worth $10,000. The fourth round is called "Without Words", where the instrumental part of the song is played. The first three songs are worth $10,000 each and the Fast Track is worth $20,000.

Seasons 4 and 5
The first round is the "Shazam Shuffle", where the first four songs are worth $1,000 each and the Fast Track is worth $2,000. In the second round, "That's My Jam!", the first three songs are worth $2,000 each and the Fast Track is worth $4,000. In the third round, "Corinne's Choice", the first three songs are worth $4,000 each and the Fast Track is worth $8,000. In the fourth round, "Without Words", the first three songs are worth $8,000 each and the Fast Track is worth $16,000.

After the second round (third in season 1), the team in last place is eliminated and leaves with nothing. After the fourth round (fifth in season 1), the trailing team is eliminated and receives either a random amount of cash or a tenth of their money (half in the first three seasons). A team can accumulate up to $76,000 ($126,000 in season 1; $124,000 in season 2; $102,000 in season 3) during the main game. In the event of a tie after rounds two or four (three or five in season 1), one additional song, with no category given, is played as a tiebreaker, using the same rules as the main game. No money is awarded for the tiebreaker song, and the team that answers it correctly in the fastest time moves on to the next round.

Bonus round: Beat Shazam
The winning team attempts to identify five more songs, one at a time before Shazam can do so. Each correct answer awards the team $25,000. No multiple-choice answers are offered in this round, and each song is in a different category. The team must answer with the exact wording of the title. A yellow ring on the gameboard steadily disappears to act as a timer; the contestants must buzz in before it is completely gone. If the team fails to buzz in on any song, or fails to identify any song, they lose the opportunity to play for $1,000,000.

After all five songs have been played, the team is given a category for a sixth and final song. They may either end the game and keep their winnings or attempt to identify this song. If they choose to continue, only one team member may play. If the contestant correctly names the song before Shazam, the team's entire winnings are doubled; if the team beats Shazam on all six songs, the team's winnings are increased to the grand prize of $1,000,000. Giving a wrong answer or no answer on the final song cuts the team's winnings in half. However, if they choose to keep their winnings and not face the final song, they are given a chance to see if they can identify the last song. If they correctly name the song, they are not awarded any money and if they incorrectly name the song, they don't lose any money.

Without winning the grand prize, a team can win up to $352,000 ($452,000 in season 1; $448,000 in season 2; $404,000 in season 3) over the course of the entire game, by identifying every song in the main game, beating Shazam on four of the first five songs in the bonus round, then beating it again on the sixth.

There have been three teams who successfully "Beat Shazam" and won the $1,000,000 grand prize:
Christina Porcelli and Steve Lester (Season 1; June 22, 2017)
Donna Natosi and Ryan Walton (Season 2; June 26, 2018)
Brothers Aaron and Martin Smith (Season 3 premiere; Teacher's Special; May 20, 2019)

Episodes

Awards and nominations

Guest appearances 
Terrence Howard - Season 1, Episode 1
Odell Beckham Jr. - Season 1, Episode 2
Tony Gonzalez - Season 1, Episode 3
MC Hammer - Season 1, Episode 4
Snoop Dogg - Season 1, Episode 5
Mariah Carey - Season 1, Episode 6
Christina Milian - Season 1, Episode 11
Kareem Abdul-Jabbar - Season 2, Episode 2
Michael Bolton - Season 2, Episode 3
Bell Biv DeVoe - Season 2, Episode 4
Ginuwine - Season 2, Episode 5
Smokey Robinson - Season 2, Episode 8
TLC - Season 2, Episode 9
Joey McIntyre, Lance Bass, Shaquille O'Neal - Season 2, Episode 11

An episode featuring a guest appearance by Demi Lovato was slated to air on July 24, 2018, but a different new episode was shown instead due to Lovato's hospitalization after an apparent overdose. The episode eventually aired on September 11, 2018 with Lovato's appearance edited out. Her appearance was broadcast by GameTV on September 29, 2020.

References

External links
 
 

2010s American game shows
2017 American television series debuts
2020s American game shows
English-language television shows
Fox Broadcasting Company original programming
Musical game shows
Television series by Endemol
Television series by MGM Television